The Petru Maior University of Târgu Mureș, Romania, was a university founded in 1960. In September 2018, Petru Maior University was incorporated into the University of Medicine and Pharmacy of Târgu Mureș.

History
Founded in 1960 as The Pedagogical Institute of Tîrgu Mureş, Petru Maior University became The Technical University of Tîrgu Mureş in 1991, The University of Tîrgu Mureş in 1995 and was renamed Petru Maior University in 1996 in the honour of the Romanian historian, philosopher, and linguist Petru Maior.

Departments
The University had 3 faculties, all currently being integrated into the University of Medicine, Pharmacy, Science and Technology of Târgu Mureș:
 Faculty of Economics, Law and Administrative Studies
 Faculty of Sciences and Letters
 Faculty of Engineering

References 

Universities in Târgu Mureș
Educational institutions established in 1960
1960 establishments in Romania